Tor H. Pedersen (born 14 February 1964) is a retired Norwegian football defender.

Hailing from Bukta in Tromsø, Soleng joined Tromsø IL as a child and became a stalwart in central defense. He helped win the 1986 Norwegian Football Cup, and was also capped once for Norway. In 1995 he went into semi-retirement with two seasons for IF Skarp, the first as player-manager.

He settled as a banker in Tromsø.

References

1964 births
Living people
Sportspeople from Tromsø
Norwegian footballers
Norway international footballers
Tromsø IL players
Norwegian First Division players
Eliteserien players
Association football defenders